Route 43 is a  extension of New York State Route 43 (NY 43) into Massachusetts. Unlike NY 43, which is signed east-west, Massachusetts Route 43 is a north-south route. Route 43's northern terminus is at Route 2 in Williamstown. Along the way it intersects U.S. Route 7 (US 7) in Williamstown.

Route description

Massachusetts Route 43 begins at the eastern end of New York State Route 43 in Hancock.  It turns northward through the Kinderhook Creek valley in the Taconic Mountains, passing near Jiminy Peak, and passing through the northern half of Hancock before entering Williamstown.  In Williamstown, the road continues north-northeastward, and crosses U.S. Route 7 in the southern part of town.  After crossing U.S. 7, the road turns right onto Green River Road, which follows its namesake (a tributary of the Hoosac River) around the south and east sides of Stone Hill, before ending at Route 2 just east of the Williams College campus.

Historically, Route 43 was a part of New England Route 7, also known as the Mohawk Trail. The Mohawk Trail now ends on Route 2 at U.S. Route 7 in the center of Williamstown.

Major intersections

References

External links

043